The Assumption of Mary Cathedral  also called Memorial Cathedral of World Peace (世界平和記念聖堂) is a religious building  affiliated with the Catholic Church  located in  Hiroshima, Japan.

The church was designed by Togo Murano. It  follows the Roman or Latin rite and serves as the principal church of the Diocese of Hiroshima (Dioecesis Hiroshimaensis カトリック広島教区) which was created in 1959 with the bull Qui arcano of Pope John XXIII.

Pope John Paul II visited the church on his tour of Japan in February 1981. It was built in tribute to the victims of war and the nuclear bomb that was dropped on the city. Father Enomiya Lassalle, who was exposed to the atomic bomb in Hiroshima, began construction in 1950 and opened in 1954.

See also

Roman Catholicism in Japan
Assumption of Mary

References

Roman Catholic cathedrals in Japan
Buildings and structures in Hiroshima
Roman Catholic churches completed in 1954
Togo Murano buildings
20th-century Roman Catholic church buildings in Japan